ISO 10218 Robots and robotic devices — Safety requirements for industrial robots is an international standard for industrial robot safety, developed by ISO/TC 184/SC 2 "Robots and robotic devices" in parallel with the European Committee for Standardization. It consists of two parts:
 Part 1: Robots
 Part 2: Robot systems and integration
As a European standard it has the designation EN ISO 10218-1 and -2 (not to be mixed with EN 10218).

ISO/TS 15066 was published in 2016 to address the new field of safety requirements for cobots.

Revisions to the original standard have been planned by the ISO/TC 299 committee. They are expected to be released in 2021.

References 

10218